The   is a  Grade 1 flat horse race in Japan for three-year-old thoroughbred fillies run over a distance of 2,000 metres (approximately 1 1/4 miles) at the Kyoto Racecourse, Fushimi-ku, Kyoto, Kyoto Prefecture in October.

The Shūka Shō is the final leg of the Japanese Fillies' Triple Crown, preceded by the Oka Sho and the Yushun Himba.  In 1996 it was established as Domestic Grade 1 race, and in 2009 it was granted International Grade 1 status.

Winners

The 2021 and 2022 runings were contested at Hanshin Racecourse, due to construction at Kyoto Racecourse.

See also
 Horse racing in Japan
 List of Japanese flat horse races

References 

Racing Post: 

Horse races in Japan
Turf races in Japan
Flat horse races for three-year-olds